Monastery Interior (full title - Monastery Interior - the Cordeliers de l'Observance Monastery) is a 19th century painting by Fleury François Richard, now in the musée des Beaux-Arts de Lyon. It shows part of the former Cordeliers (Franciscan) monastery on the site known as 'Clos des Deux-Amants' - the site is now occupied by the Conservatoire national supérieur de musique et de danse de Lyon.

Sources
Sylvie Ramond (dir.), Gérard Bruyère et Léna Widerkher, Le Temps de la peinture : Lyon, 1800-1914, Lyon, Fage éditions, 2007, 335 p., ill. en coul.

19th-century paintings
Paintings in the collection of the Museum of Fine Arts of Lyon
Paintings by Fleury François Richard